Thank You Thank You is an album by drummer Roy Haynes which was recorded in 1977 and released on the Galaxy label.

Reception

The AllMusic review by Scott Yanow stated "This somewhat obscure outing features Haynes in a variety of settings ... The music ranges from poppish to more straightahead with plenty of diverse moods explored".

Track listing
 "Thank You Thank You" (George Cables) – 7:01
 "Bullfight" (Roy Haynes) – 11:08
 "Quiet Fire" (Cables) – 8:14
 "Processional" (Kenneth Nash, Roy Haynes) – 5:24
 "Sweet Song" (Stanley Cowell) – 6:19

Personnel
Roy Haynes – drums
John Klemmer – tenor saxophone (track 1)
Stanley Cowell (tracks 2 & 5), George Cables (tracks 1 & 3) – piano, electric piano 
Milcho Leviev – piano (track 2) 
Bobby Hutcherson – vibraphone (tracks 1, 2 & 5) 
Marcus Fiorillo – guitar (track 2)
Ron Carter (track 1), Cecil McBee (tracks 2, 3 & 5) – bass
Kenneth Nash – percussion (tracks 2-4)

References

Galaxy Records albums
Roy Haynes albums
1977 albums